David Scott (1689 – 1 December 1766), of Scotstarvit, was a Scottish Member of Parliament. He was the son of David Scott of Scotstarvit (died 1718).

Biography

Scott was returned to Fife in 1741, and held that seat for a decade. In 1751, he was returned to Aberdeen, for which he sat until his death. By his wife Lucy, daughter of Sir Robert Gordon, he had several children, including:

David Scott of Scotstarvit, eldest son and heir, died without issue;
Maj-Gen. John Scott (British Army officer) (d. 1776);
Marjory, who married David Murray, 5th Viscount of Stormont.

Notes

1689 births
1766 deaths
Members of the Parliament of Great Britain for Scottish constituencies
British MPs 1741–1747
British MPs 1747–1754
British MPs 1754–1761
British MPs 1761–1768